Walmart, Inc., like many large retail and grocery chain stores, offers private brands.

Apparel brands

Major brands

In March 2018, to better compete with Amazon and Target, Walmart introduced three new clothing lines and revamped an existing clothing line.
George – men's casual and dress clothing, shoes, and accessories (previously also women's and children's)
Terra & Sky – plus size women's clothing
Time and Tru – misses size women's clothing, shoes, and accessories
Wonder Nation – children's clothing, shoes, and accessories
K Alexander – Men's Accessories

Other brands
Athletic Works – men's, women's, and children's activewear
Brahma – men's and women's work boots 
EV1 – women's casual clothing, accessories, and shoes endorsed by American television personality Ellen DeGeneres
No Boundaries, often abbreviated as NOBO – junior size women's and young men's clothing, shoes, and accessories
Joyspun – women's sleepwear and intimates

Major brands

Sam's Choice

Sam's Choice, originally introduced as Sam's American Choice in 1991, is a retail brand in food and selected hard goods. Named after Sam Walton, founder of Walmart, Sam's Choice forms the premium tier of Walmart's two-tiered core corporate grocery branding strategy that also includes the larger Great Value brand of discount-priced staple items.

Compared to Great Value products and to other national brands, Sam's Choice is positioned as a premium retail brand and is offered at a price competitive with standard national brands. It typically offers either competitive items in a given product category, or items in categories where the market leader is an "icon" (for example, Coca-Cola in the soft drink category).

Most Sam's Choice beverage products (excluding Grapette and Orangette) are manufactured for Walmart by Cott Beverages. Other products in the line, including cookies, snack items, frozen meals, and similar grocery items, are made by a variety of agricultural and food manufacturers.

Competitive pricing of the Sam's Choice brand and store-branded and generic goods is possible because of the lower expense required to market a retail chain's house brand, compared to advertising and promotional expenses typically incurred by the national brands.

Most Sam's Choice-branded products have been replaced by either the relaunched Great Value brand, or the new Marketside brand. The brand was reintroduced in 2013 with a new logo and a focus on premium food products with organic ingredients.

Great Value

Great Value was launched in 1993 (but products were made as early as 1992) and forms the second tier, or national brand equivalent ("NBE"), of Walmart's grocery branding strategy.

Products offered through the Great Value brand are often claimed by Walmart to be as good as national brand offerings, but are typically sold at a lower price because of lower marketing and advertising expense. As a house or store brand, the Great Value line does not consist of goods produced by Walmart, but is a labeling system for items manufactured and packaged by a number of agricultural and food corporations, such as ConAgra, and Sara Lee which, in addition to releasing products under its own brand and exclusively for Walmart, also manufactures and brands foods for a variety of other chain stores. Often, this labeling system does not list location of manufacture of the product. Walmart contends that all Great Value products are produced in the United States. Otherwise, the country of origin would be listed.

As Walmart's most extensively developed retail brand, covering hundreds of household consumable items, the Great Value line includes sliced bread, frozen vegetables, frozen dinners, canned foods, light bulbs, trash bags, buttermilk biscuits, cinnamon rolls, pies, and many other traditional grocery store products. The wide range of items marketed under the Great Value banner makes it Walmart's top-selling retail brand.

The Great Value brand can also be seen in Canada, Costa Rica, Honduras, Nicaragua, El Salvador, Mexico, Argentina, Chile, and Brazil and some Trust Mart stores in Hunza Pakistan, through a partnership with Walmart but China is not included anywhere. Bharti EasyDay retail grocery stores sell Great Value brand products in India as well. Great Value brand products as well as Walmart merchandise are also present in Seiyu grocery stores (owned by Walmart) in Tokyo, Japan as of October 2014, despite at least one report of a transition away from the brand.

In 2009, the Great Value labels were redesigned to be predominantly white. The new redesign also includes over 80 new items, including thin-crust pizza, fat-free caramel swirl ice cream, strawberry yogurt, organic cage-free eggs, double-stuffed sandwich cookies, and teriyaki beef jerky. Walmart changed the formulas for 750 items, including: breakfast cereal, cookies, yogurt, laundry detergent, and paper towels. Great Value went through another redesign in 2013 for most of its food items, replacing predominantly white designs with more colorful packaging.

Equate

Equate is a brand used by Walmart for consumable pharmacy and health and beauty items, such as shaving cream, skin lotion, over-the-counter medications, and pregnancy tests. Before its takeover by Walmart, the formerly independent Equate brand sold consumer products at both Target and Walmart at lower prices than those of name brands. Equate is an example of the strength of Walmart's private label store brand. In a 2006 study, The Hartman Group marketing research firm issued a report which found that "Five of the top 10 "likely to purchase" private label brands are managed by Walmart including: Great Value, Equate, Sam's Choice, Walmart, and Member's Mark (Sam's Club), per the study." The report further noted that "...we are struck by the magnitude of mind-share Walmart appears to hold in shoppers' minds when it comes to awareness of private label brands and retailers."

In mid-2010, the brand underwent a logo redesign, as well as packaging changes similar to the Great Value brand.

Mainstays
Mainstays is a brand marketed by Walmart for bedding, kitchen utensils, ready-to-assemble furniture, and home decor. Walmart also has the Better Homes & Gardens brand of home goods and furniture.

Ol' Roy
Ol' Roy is Walmart's store brand of dog food, created in 1983 and named after Sam Walton's dog. It has become the number-one selling brand of dog food in the United States. It is comparable to Nestlé's Purina.

In 1998, samples of Ol' Roy (together with various other brands) were subject to qualitative analyses for pentobarbital residue by the U.S. Food and Drug Administration Center for Veterinary Medicine due to suspicion that the anesthetizing drug may have found its way into pet foods through euthanized animals. Pentobarbital was found in 5 out of the 8 Ol' Roy samples in the initial survey. The highest level of pentobarbital detected among all dog foods tested was an Ol' Roy formulation (Puppy Formula, Chicken and Rice) at 32ppb. The CVM concluded this level of pentobarbital would be unlikely to cause adverse effects even to the smallest dogs.

Special Kitty
Special Kitty is Walmart's store brand of cat food and other cat care products, such as litter and treats.

Parent's Choice
Parent's Choice is Walmart's store brand; including diapers, formula, and accessories. Like other Walmart store brands, its design and packaging was relaunched in 2010. Parent's Choice is manufactured by Wyeth, a pharmaceutical company that is a subsidiary of Pfizer.  On October 15, 2009, representatives of Pfizer signed the final acquisition papers, making Wyeth a wholly owned subsidiary of that company, thus completing the US$68-billion dollar deal.

Play Day
Play Day is a wide-ranging brand of budget-priced children's toys. Play Day launched in between mid-2014 and early-2015, as a replacement brand for Kid Connection.

Pen+Gear
Pen+Gear is Walmart's store brand for school and office supplies. From notebooks, pens, markers, paper, binders, pencils and even paper shredders. Pen+Gear replaced the brand name Casemate in late 2016.

Additional brands

Homelines
Better Homes and Gardens is a product line with designs inspired from the popular magazine of the same name. It forms the premium tier to the Mainstays home brand, producing goods such as furniture, kitchen products, bedding, curtains and window blinds, decor, and other home products. 
Hometrends products include small furniture, tableware and various home decor accessories, such as rugs and faux plants. (Discontinued in USA market)
Mainstays Kids
Your Zone is a home product line that tailors toward teenagers and college students.

Others
Adventure Force − toys suitable for outdoor use. Products include waterarms (water blaster guns).
Allswell, a luxury bedding and mattress brand owned by Walmart, but only sold direct to consumer
AutoDrive – car care products, auto detailing products, interior accessories and some low price exterior accessories such as license plate frames 
Best Occasions – party decorations and accessories, such as candles and hats
Bike Shop - bicycle tires, tubes, and accessories
Clear American – carbonated and flavored water. Was previously known as Sam's Choice Clear American
Co Squared, a cosmetics brand owned by Walmart, but only sold direct to consumer
ColorPlace – paint and painting tools. ColorPlace paint is made by PPG
Douglas – budget priced tires. Models include Xtra-Trac and Touring. Some models are made in a Goodyear plant.
Earth Spirit - shoes
EverStart is the brand for automotive and lawn mower batteries. The brand is also used for battery-related accessories, such as jumper cables. EverStart batteries are manufactured by Johnson Controls, Inc., (who also manufactures batteries for other store brands) primarily at plants in Saint Joseph, Missouri, and Fort Wayne, Indiana.
Expert Grill – grills, charcoal, and grilling accessories (Replaced Backyard Grill)
Fire Side Gourmet – pre-cooked burgers and steaks (was previously under the Sam's Choice label)
Gold's Gym – athletic and exercise equipment such as weights. Named after and licensed from the chain of fitness centers.
Hart - power tools and outdoor power equipment 
Holiday Time – Christmas items such as Christmas trees, decorations, and wrapping paper
Home Bake Value – bread
Hyper Tough – hand tools, hardware and storage, some power tools (power tool lineup is gradually being replaced by Hart)
Kid Connection is used primarily for children's toys, but was also used for children's clothing and shoes.
Marketside – fresh foods usually found in Walmart's deli, produce, and bakery departments, such as salads, soups, breads, and sandwiches
Mash-Up Coffee (Walmart-exclusive) – luxury coffee beans
Motile - laptops, miscellaneous tech, and tech accessories
Oak Leaf – low-cost wines produced and bottled for Walmart selling at approximately $3 a bottle.
Onn (stylized as onn.) – consumer electronics, computer accessories, audio/visual accessories, and phone/tablet accessories
Our Finest/Notre Excellence is a brand for upscale chips, cookies, frozen dinners, etc. which are sold exclusively in Canada. This brand is comparable to World Table and is manufactured in Canada exclusively for Walmart Canada.
Overpowered – pre-built gaming desktops and laptops
Ozark Trail – outdoor equipment and footwear. (The Walmart Home Office is located in the Ozark mountain region in northwest Arkansas.)
Price First/Prix Budget – entry-level everyday products, similar to Great Value, but generally at the lowest price point
Protege – luggage and travel accessories
ReliOn – diabetes care products, including blood glucose and blood pressure monitors, as well as medical thermometers, portable humidifiers and replacement filters for both ReliOn and name brand humidifiers
Spark Imagine - simple children's toys made with high-quality materials; comparable to Melissa and Doug
SuperTech is Walmart's brand of motor oil. Oil for both gasoline and diesel engines is sold under the SuperTech brand. The brand is also used on other consumable automotive products, such as oil filters, windshield wiper fluid, and transmission fluid.
Tasty - kitchen tools (Walmart exclusive under license from BuzzFeed)
The Office – office supplies and stationery
Uniquely J, a brand under Walmart's Jet.com website
Walmart Family Mobile is Walmart's exclusive prepaid mobile phone (cell phone) service provided through the T-Mobile cellular network.
World Table – upscale salsa, pizza, chips, cookies, etc., which are manufactured exclusively for Walmart and fancier than the Great Value entry
WAY TO CELEBRATE! – holidays such as Halloween, Valentine's Day, and St. Patrick's Day are manufactured exclusively at Walmart

Former brands
Backyard Grill – grills, charcoal, and grilling accessories (Discontinued)
 Durabrand was a brand used for home electronics, such as televisions and DVD players. The brand was also used on various small kitchen appliances.
 iLo Technologies was another brand of home electronics, consisting of more upscale items such as televisions, small electronics and digital music players.
 Blackweb were premium electronics products; discontinued after a rebranding of the Onn line in 2020.
 Canopy was a home product line for rooms and other domestic goods. The brand was replaced by the Better Homes and Gardens line in 2012.
 Casemate was Walmart's school and office supplies brand in 2015. In late 2016, it was replaced by Pen+Gear.
 Faded Glory was an apparel brand for women, men, and children. It was replaced by Time & Tru (for women), George (for men), and Wonder Nation (for children) in 2018.
 Metro 7 was an upscale brand of women's apparel that was originally released in the fall of 2006 and eventually was discontinued.
 Price First was a bottom-tier, low-priced generic brand that Walmart introduced in late 2013. It included very basic grocery items, trash bags, and paper goods. It was launched as an experimental brand targeted towards the most budget-conscious shoppers. It was the lowest priced brand at Walmart and availability varied by stores. Some of the grocery items included milk (which is often brand-name milk with a Price First label, as is Great Value milk), bread, granulated sugar, canned fruit/vegetables, boxed brownie mix, toaster pastries, elbow pasta, egg noodles, spaghetti, and skillet meals. Non-grocery items included paper towels, toilet tissue, trash bags, and food storage bags. The brand was discontinued in 2016.
 Promark was a brand for tools in the 1980s and early 1990s. It was replaced by Popular Mechanics branding.
 Puritan was a brand for men's basic clothing, including shirts, pants, undergarments, socks, ties, and some accessories. In late 2010, the brand was discontinued and replaced by Faded Glory (with undergarments, socks and casual clothing) and George (with ties, shirts, pants and formal clothing).
 725 Originals was a brand at Walmart Canada that targeted teens. It was consolidated into the George label in 2010.

See also
 Big-box store
 Niagara Bottling

References

External links

Canopy Living website
Is onn. TV Walmart brand

Walmart